The Musical Quarterly is the oldest academic journal on music in America. Originally established in 1915 by Oscar Sonneck, the journal was edited by Sonneck until his death in 1928. Sonneck was succeeded by a number of editors, including Carl Engel (1930–1944), Gustave Reese (1944-45), Paul Henry Lang, who edited the journal for over 25 years, from 1945 to 1973, Joan Peyser (1977–84), Eric Salzman who served as editor from 1984 to 1991 and several others.

Since 1993 The Musical Quarterly has been edited by Leon Botstein, president of Bard College and principal conductor of the American Symphony Orchestra. Originally published by G. Schirmer, Inc., it is published by Oxford University Press.

References

External links
 
 Articles published before 1923 at the Internet Archive

Publications established in 1915
Music journals
Oxford University Press academic journals
Quarterly journals
English-language journals